Abhishek Singh (born 12 November 1984) is an Indian cricketer. He made his first-class debut for Chhattisgarh in the 2016–17 Ranji Trophy on 5 November 2016.

References

External links
 

1984 births
Living people
Indian cricketers
Chhattisgarh cricketers